The New Caledonian Armed Forces or FANC is the name by which the French armed forces based in New Caledonia are referred to and also is a subdivision of the French armed forces.

Command 

The FANC is commanded by the Commanding Officer FANC (COMSUP FANC), who is under the command of the Chief of the Defence Staff. The Commanding officer is usually a Brigade general. The command is headquartered in Nouméa.

Composition 

The forces number 1750 from the 3 branches of the armed forces (excluding the Gendarmerie) of which 1200 are permanent. 

Army: The Pacific Marine Infantry Regiment (RIMAP-NC) has 3 bases. About 80 percent of the 700-member regiment is composed of soldiers on short-term (four month) deployments from metropolitan France. As of 2018, only about 30 personnel in the regiment were locally recruited. 
Navy: Based at the Pointe Chalaix Naval Base, the flagship is Vendémiaire (F734). Other elements of the naval contingent include: one P400-class patrol vessel, La Glorieuse, and the patrol and support vessel D'Entrecasteaux. In early 2023, La Glorieuse is to be replaced by Auguste Benebig, the lead ship of the new Félix Éboué-class of patrol vessels. The French Navy will further reinforce its offshore patrol capabilities in New Caledonia by deploying a second vessel of the class (Jean Tranape) to the territory by 2025. One Engins de Débarquement Amphibie – Standards (EDA-S) landing craft is also to be delivered to naval forces based in New Caledonia by 2025. The landing craft is to better support coastal and riverine operations in the territory. 
Air Force and Naval Aviation: Based at the Paul Klein Air Base (BA 186). As of the latter 2010s, French naval aviation and air force elements in New Caledonia included two Navy Falcon 200 Gardian maritime surveillance aircraft (drawn from Flotilla 25F), which are to be replaced by the more modern Falcon 2000 Albatros starting in 2025, and two Casa CN235 transport aircraft and three Puma helicopters from the Air Force's 52 “Tontouta” Squadron.Prior to 2022, the frigate Vendémiaire operated the Alouette III helicopter. However, with the retirement of the type in 2022, it is being replaced by the Eurocopter Dauphin N3. In 2022, the French Air Force demonstrated a capacity to reinforce the territory by deploying three Rafale fighters, supported by A400M transport aircraft and A330 MRTT Phénix tankers, from France to New Caledonia for a three-week exercise.

Responsibilities 

 National defence and security
 Protection of France's regional interests
 Support state policies in New Caledonia and Wallis et Futuna.
 Rescue missions
 Aid and cooperation with other states in the region

Gendarmerie nationale 

The paramilitary police has its own command structure. Some 855 personnel from the National Gendarmerie are stationed on the archipelago divided into 4 companies, 27 brigades and several specialized and mobile Gendarmerie units. During periods such the 2021 referendum on independence, these forces have been significantly reinforced with personnel deployed from metropolitan France.The air component includes two Écureuil helicopters while the Maritime Gendarmerie deploys the patrol boat Dumbea (P606) in the territory.

See also
 French Armed Forces
 New Caledonia
 Troupes de marine

References

External links 
 Official site of the French Armed Forces in New Caledonia

Military units and formations of France
Joint military units and formations